Dysoxylum is a flowering plant genus of trees and shrubs from the mahogany family, Meliaceae.

Botanical science has recorded about eighty species in this genus, growing widely across the regions of Malesia, the western Pacific ocean, Australia and south & southeastern Asia; centred on the tropics between the Pacific and Indian Oceans.

They grow naturally in New Guinea, eastern and northern Australia, New Caledonia, Fiji, SE Asia, southern China, the Indian subcontinent, the Philippines, Taiwan, and in the western Pacific Ocean their most easterly occurrences, in the Caroline Islands, New Zealand and Niue.

The etymology of its name Dysoxylum derives from the Greek word ‘Dys’ meaning "bad" referring to "ill-smelling" and ‘Xylon’ meaning "wood".

Distribution 
New Guinea has records of twenty eight species growing naturally, sixteen of them endemic.
New Caledonia has recorded nine, eight of them endemic.
Fiji has recorded nine, seven of them endemic.
In northern and eastern coastal regions of Australia fifteen recorded species grow naturally, known as "rosewoods", though they are not closely related to the true rosewoods (Dalbergia) which are legumes.

In Australia, Dysoxylum fraserianum is the original rose wood. The name rosewood was given for the odour of its freshly cut bark like a fragrance of roses. The species was named ‘fraserianum’ after Charles Fraser, the first colonial botanist of New South Wales. Fourteen more species are reported in Australia, distributed from within New South Wales, north through the humid east coast regions to the diversity of species in the wet tropics rainforests region of northeastern Queensland, on to Cape York Peninsula, northern parts of the Northern Territory and Western Australia.

New Zealand has one endemic species D. spectabile, while Niue (island), further east at the global eastern limit of records of the genus, has a single species, the widespread (non-endemic) D. mollissimum subsp molle.
On the remote oceanic islands within Australia's territorial waters, Lord Howe Island has one endemic species D. pachyphyllum; Norfolk Island shares the restricted, but not locally endemic, D. bijugum with New Caledonia and Fiji; and Christmas Island shares a single widespread species D. gaudichaudianum with Australia, Malesia and SE Asia.

In the southern half of China eleven recorded species grow naturally, one of them endemic.

In Sri Lanka, India and nearby Bhutan and Nepal (Indian subcontinent) large trees of the genus Dysoxylum grow naturally in forests from lowlands to mid altitude mountains. About ten to twelve recognised species grow naturally in this region. Endemic Indian species: D. beddomei, D. binectariferum, D. ficiforme and D. malabaricum. Endemic Sri Lankan species: D. championii. Species occurring in India, Sri Lanka, nearby and more widely: D. excelsum, D. gotadhora, D. grande, D. mollissimum and D. pallens.
In the Indonesian Rain Forest Area of Java, the plant species reported is Dysoxylum caulostachyum.

Habitats 
These trees are important components of the native tropical forests of their range, such as New Guinea, the lowland New Caledonia rain forests and the tropical forests of northern Australia.
In this region more than forty different species grow naturally, from the lowlands to the mountains. In New Guinea D. enantiophyllum and an undescribed taxon have records of growing up to about  altitude.

In the forests of the region of China, India, Sri Lanka and the adjacent Himalayas including Bhutan and Nepal, about fourteen recorded different species grow naturally from the lowlands to the mountains up to  altitude.

In the region of southern China, Burma, Thailand, Malay Peninsula, Sumatra, Java, Lesser Sunda Islands, Borneo (Sarawak, Sabah, east Kalimantan), Philippines and Sulawesi, the Dysoxylum species most widely distributed is known as Dysoxylum densiflorum (meaning in Latin:"densely flowered"). It is found in elevation up to   elevation in alluvial soil conditions (clay and sand) and along rivers and streams and also in limestone formation in undisturbed mixed dipterocarp and sub-montane forests types.

In India, it is also known by many other names such as, Indian white cedar, Bili devdari, Bombay white cedar, Velley agile, Porapa, Vella agil and Devagarige and in the evergreen forest regions of Western Ghats, North Kanara, Coorg, Anamalais, and Travancore regions.

Cultural connections 

Dysoxylum densiflorum, locally known as majegau, is the plant "mascot" or floral emblem of Bali. It is found in Bali's Botanic Garden located about 50 km to north of at Denpasar, the capital city of Bali.

A postage stamp was proposed to be issued by Indonesia on the rich flora and fauna of its provinces. It was proposed to issue 33 stamps in succession between 2008 and 2011. In 2008 the series issued represented the province of Bali with the stamp depicting floral species of Dysoxylum densiflorum, known as Majegau in Indonesian language. The stamp issue described the qualities of this species as "one of woods commonly used for Balinese carving material thanks to its strength and beautiful colour and pattern". Majegau (Dysoxylum densiflorum) and Bali starling (Leucopsar rothschildi) of Bali are also part of this series.

Ecological connections 

The tooth-billed pigeon (Didunculus strigirostris) feeds mainly on the fruits of the Dysoxylum trees growing in its native Samoa. Foliage of D. mollissimum provides food for caterpillars of the Hercules moth (Coscinocera hercules). Among the better-known pathogens affecting this genus is Pseudomonas syringae pv. dysoxylis which often initiates frost damage in Kohekohe.

The bio cultural studies initiated in the villages of Kerala indicated that nearly 50% of the seeds of Dysoxylum malabaricum could be raised as seedlings. Dysoxylum malabaricum known as white cedar belongs to the plant family Meliaceae, is called  as Vella akil in Malayalam language, Vellayagil in Tamil language and Bilibudlige in Kannada language, all names attributing to the white colour of the species.

The tree grows to height of 40 m height, has bark which is greyish-yellow in colour with inner bark in creamy yellow colour. Its leaves alternate or sub opposite, abruptly pinnate with angular rachis. Flowers which mature during February–April are greenish yellow in colour and bisexual. Fruits that ripen during June–July are capsules. While natural regeneration process is common, artificial regeneration of seeds is also done by storing them in wet bags. The seeds are then sown in nursery beds of sand and soil at the rate of 3:1, and germination has been noted to occur within 70 days. Its chemical composition is known by the name “ashtagandha”, which means a fragrant smell, which is used for making incense sticks commonly used for worship. It is used for fumigation and also for Hindu ritual of fire sacrifice called yagna. Its wide therapeutic use, after making a decoction of the bark is for curing arthritis, anorexia, cardiac debility, to remove intestinal worms, inflammation, leprosy and rheumatism. Its oil is used for curing ear ache and eye diseases.

Uses 
The Australian species were prized for their wood which is a rich red in colour and was widely used in the furniture trade. The common timber name for the Australian species is the rose mahogany. The New Zealand species, Kohekohe (D. spectabile), is sometimes known as New Zealand mahogany, because its wood is light, strong and polishes to a fine red colour.

Rohitukine (C16H19O5N), a chromane alkaloid, was first reported from Amoora rohituka (Roxb.) Wight & Arn. (Meliaceae) and then from D. binectariferum . Rohitukine exhibits both anti-inflammatory as well as immuno-modulatory properties besides acting as an anticancer compound. Rohitukine is an important precursor for the semi-synthetic derivative, flavopiridol (C21H20Cl NO5).

In India, apart from its economic importance for building and furniture making, it is an important ingredient in Ayurvedic Medicine as many species have curative qualities taken independtly or as an ingredient of a medicinal mixture. Some of the uses in Ayurveda  reported are; Wood decoction of D. malabaricum to cure rheumatism and its oil is used to cure eye and ear diseases; a few species are used to cure inflammation, cardio-disorder, CNS disorder and also tumor. In Indian tradition and culture oil is extracted from the seeds Dysoxylum malabaricum, which has wide beneficial application.

Species 
The majority of this listing draws from the 1995 Flora Malesiana genus treatment by David Mabberley, with further sourcing from his 2008 Flora of China genus treatment. Then the Dec 2010 Australian Tropical Rainforest Plants identification system and the carefully cross-checked species from the older 1985 Flora Vitiensis (Fiji) add a minority number of different species.

 Dysoxylum acutangulum 
 subsp. acutangulum – Peninsular Thailand, Malesia: Sumatra, Malay Peninsula, Borneo, Philippines
 subsp. foveolatum  – New Guinea, Solomon Is., Queensland, NT, N. Australia; Malesia: Sumatra, Java, Flores, Timor, Moluccas
 Dysoxylum alatum  – New Guinea
 Dysoxylum aliquantulum  – Fiji endemic
 Dysoxylum alliaceum  – New Guinea, Solomon Is., coastal central QLD to the wet tropics and Cape York; throughout Malesia; Peninsular Thailand, Andaman Is., SE Asia
 Dysoxylum aneityense  – Vanuatu
 Dysoxylum angustifolium  – "restricted to the river systems on the east of the Malay Peninsula"
 Dysoxylum annae  – NW lowland New Guinea
 Dysoxylum arborescens , Mossman mahogany – New Guinea, Pacific Is. incl. Solomon Is., Vanuatu; Queensland wet tropics, Cape York; throughout Malesia incl. Philippines, Borneo, Sumatra; Andaman Is., Nicobar Is., Taiwan
 Dysoxylum beddomei  – India
 Dysoxylum bijugum ; Synonyms: D. patersoni, D. patersonianum – Fiji, New Caledonia, Norfolk Is.
 Dysoxylum binectariferum  – India to Vietnam
 Dysoxylum boridianum  – New Guinea. Only Boridi village, Port Moresby district, central PNG
 Dysoxylum brachybotrys  – Malesia: Borneo, Philippines
 Dysoxylum brassii  – New Guinea
 Dysoxylum brevipaniculum  – central eastern New Guinea
 Dysoxylum canalense  – New Caledonia endemic
 Dysoxylum carolinae  – Vietnam; Malesia: Sumatra, Malay Peninsula, Borneo
 Dysoxylum cauliflorum  – Vietnam, Cambodia, Thailand; Malesia: Sumatra, Bangka, Malay Peninsula, Borneo, Philippines, Burma
 Dysoxylum championii  – Sri Lanka
 Dysoxylum crassum  – Borneo
 Dysoxylum cumingianum  – Taiwan, Philippines, Sulawesi, Bali, Moluccas, Malaysia
 Dysoxylum cyrtobotryum  – SE Asia to Malesia: Nicobar Is., Andaman Is., Sumatra, Malay Peninsula, Borneo, Java, Bali, Flores, Philippines
 Dysoxylum densiflorum  – S. Burma, S. China, Thailand; Malesia: Sumatra, Malay Peninsula, Borneo, Java, Sulawesi, Bali, Lombok, Flores; Bali floral emblem, known as Majegau
 Dysoxylum dumosum  – Malesia: Malay Peninsula, Sumatra
 Dysoxylum enantiophyllum  – New Guinea
 Dysoxylum excelsum  – New Guinea, Solomon Is., S. China, Bhutan, Laos, NE. India, Sri Lanka, Nepal; Andaman Is.; throughout Malesia incl. Philippines; Indochina incl. Thailand, Vietnam

 Dysoxylum flavescens  – Malesia: Sumatra, Malay Peninsula, Borneo
 Dysoxylum fraserianum  – eastern subtropical Australian rainforests, New South Wales, Queensland
 Dysoxylum gaudichaudianum , ivory mahogany; Synonyms: D. amooroides, D. blancoi, D. decandrum, D. maota, D. rufum var. glabrescens, D. salutare – New Guinea, eastern Queensland, Christmas Is., Bismarck Archipelago, SW Pacific Is.: Solomon Is. Vanuatu, Samoa; Malesia: Java, Sumbawa, Flores, Timor, Sulawesi, Philippines, Moluccas
 Dysoxylum gillespieanum  – Fiji endemic
 Dysoxylum gotadhora  – S. China, Hainan, Bhutan, India, Laos, Nepal, Thailand, Vietnam - Syn. Dysoxylum ficiforme  – India
 Dysoxylum grande ; Synonym: D. verruculosum  – NE India (Assam), S. China, Vietnam, Thailand, Hainan, Bhutan; Malesia: Sumatra, Malay Peninsula, Borneo, Philippines
 Dysoxylum hapalanthum  – north-east New Guinea
 Dysoxylum hoaense  – Vietnam
 Dysoxylum hongkongense  – S China, Hainan, Taiwan
 Dysoxylum hornei  – Fiji endemic
 Dysoxylum huntii  – Samoa endemic, known as Maota mea.
 Dysoxylum inopinatum  – northern and central New Guinea
 Dysoxylum juglans  – Laos, Vietnam
 Dysoxylum kaniense  – New Guinea, Solomon Is.
 Dysoxylum klanderi  – Queensland wet tropics endemic
 Dysoxylum kouiriense  – New Caledonia endemic
 Dysoxylum latifolium  – New Guinea, Solomon Is., Queensland wet tropics, Cape York, NT, Western Australia
 Dysoxylum lenticellare  – Fiji endemic
 Dysoxylum lenticellatum  – S. China, Burma, Thailand
 Dysoxylum loureirii  – Vietnam
 Dysoxylum macranthum  – New Caledonia endemic
 Dysoxylum macrocarpum  – Thailand; Malesia: Sumatra, Malay Peninsula, Borneo, Sulawesi, Java, Philippines
 Dysoxylum macrostachyum  – New Caledonia endemic
 Dysoxylum magnificum  – SE Sumatra, Borneo
 Dysoxylum malabaricum  – , India

 Dysoxylum minutiflorum  – New Caledonia endemic
 Dysoxylum mollissimum ; Synonyms: D. forsteri, D. muelleri – E. India, S. China, throughout Malesia, to Australia and W. Pacific
 subsp. molle ; Synonyms: D. forsteri, D. molle, D. quercifolium, D. richii , D. samoense – New Guinea, Bismarck Archipelago, Solomon Is., Vanuatu, N to Carolines; NE NSW, eastern Queensland; Pacific Is.: Fiji, Samoa, Tonga, E to Niue; Malesia: Flores, Timor, Wetar, Moluccas, W to Sulawesi
 subsp. mollissimum – India (Assam, Sikkim), Bhutan, Burma, S. China (Yunnan, Hainan); Malesia: Sumatra, Malay Peninsula, Borneo, Java, Philippines, Bali
 Dysoxylum myriandrum  – Fiji endemic
 Dysoxylum nutans  – Malesia: Sumatra, Java, Sulawesi, Bali, Sumbawa, Flores, Moluccas
 Dysoxylum oppositifolium , pink mahogany – New Guinea, Solomon Is., Queensland wet tropics, Cape York, NT; Malesia incl.: Borneo, Philippines, Sumba, Flores
 Dysoxylum pachyphyllum ; Synonym: D. fraserianum auct. non  – Lord Howe Island endemic
 Dysoxylum pachypodum  – New Caledonia endemic
 Dysoxylum pachyrhache  – Borneo
 Dysoxylum pallens  – S. China, Hainan, Bhutan, Cambodia, India, Burma, Thailand
 Dysoxylum papillosum  – Peninsular Thailand; Malesia: Malay Peninsula, Borneo
 Dysoxylum papuanum , spicy mahogany – New Guinea, Australian wet tropics through to coastal central Queensland, Solomon Is.

 Dysoxylum parasiticum , yellow mahogany – Queensland wet tropics, Cape York, New Guinea, Bismarck Archipelago, Solomon Is.; Malesia: Sumatra, E Borneo, Sulawesi, Lombok, Sumba, Sumbawa, Flores, Tanimbar, Timor, Moluccas, Philippines, Taiwan
 Dysoxylum pauciflorum  – Philippines
 Dysoxylum pettigrewianum  – New Guinea, Bismarck Archipelago: New Britain, Solomon Is., Moluccas, Queensland wet tropics
 Dysoxylum phaeotrichum  – few sites in central New Guinea
 Dysoxylum pumilum  – Queensland wet tropics endemic
 Dysoxylum randianum  – New Guinea
 Dysoxylum rigidum  – Malesia: SE Sumatra, Malay Peninsula, Borneo
 Dysoxylum roseum  – New Caledonia endemic

 Dysoxylum rubrocostatum  - Vietnam
 Dysoxylum rufescens 
 subsp. dzumacense  – New Caledonia endemic
 subsp. rufescens – New Caledonia endemic
 Dysoxylum rufum , hairy rosewood – NE NSW, eastern Queensland; Australian endemic
 Dysoxylum rugulosum  – Malesia: Sumatra, Malay Peninsula, Borneo
 Dysoxylum seemannii  – Fiji endemic
 Dysoxylum sessile  – Malesia: Moluccas
 Dysoxylum setosum  – Queensland wet tropics, Cape York, New Guinea, Timor
 Dysoxylum sparsiflorum  – New Guinea
 Dysoxylum spectabile , kohekohe, New Zealand mahogany
 Dysoxylum stellatopuberulum  – New Guinea
 Dysoxylum tenuiflorum  – Fiji endemic
 Dysoxylum tongense  – Tonga endemic
 Dysoxylum variabile  – New Guinea, Bismarck Archipelago, Solomon Is.
 Dysoxylum yunzaingense  – eastern New Guinea

References

Cited works 

 
 

 

 
Meliaceae genera